A dock landing ship (also called landing ship, dock or LSD) is an amphibious warfare ship with a well dock to transport and launch landing craft and amphibious vehicles. Some ships with well decks, such as the Soviet Ivan Rogov class, also have bow doors to enable them to deliver vehicles directly onto a beach (like a tank landing ship). Modern dock landing ships also operate helicopters.

A ship with a well deck (docking well) can transfer cargo to landing craft in rougher seas far more easily than a ship which has to use cranes or a stern ramp. The U.S. Navy hull classification symbol for a ship with a well deck depends on its facilities for aircraft—a (modern) LSD has a helicopter deck, an landing platform dock also has a hangar, and a landing helicopter dock or landing helicopter assault has a full-length flight deck.

History
The LSD (U.S. Navy hull classification for landing ship, dock) came as a result of a British requirement during the Second World War for a vessel that could carry large landing craft across the seas at speed. She entered service in 1935 and saw combat in China and during the initial phase of Japanese offenses during 1942.

The first LSD of the Royal Navy came from a design by Sir Roland Baker who had designed the British landing craft tank. It was an answer to the problem of launching small craft rapidly. The landing ship stern chute, which was a converted train ferry (Train Ferry No. 1 which had been built for British Army use in the First World War), was an early attempt. Thirteen landing craft mechanized (LCM) could be launched from these ships down the chute. The landing ship gantry was a converted tanker with a crane to transfer its cargo of landing craft from deck to sea—15 LCM in a little over half an hour.

The design was developed and built in the U.S. for the U.S. Navy and the Royal Navy. It took one and a half hours for the dock to be flooded down and two and half to pump it out. When flooded they could also be used as docks for repairs to small craft. Smaller landing craft could be carried in the hold as could full-tracked and wheeled amphibious assault or support vehicles.

Vessels

The British Royal Fleet Auxiliary (RFA) operates three s based on the Dutch-Spanish Enforcer design in support of the Royal Navy's operations, while a fourth ship of the class—previously in RFA service—is now operated by the Royal Australian Navy.

Former U.S. LSDs include the,, and.

LSD classes

In service

Decommissioned

See also
List of amphibious warfare ships
List of United States Navy amphibious warfare ships § Landing Ship Dock (LSD)
Roll-on/roll-off

References

Bibliography

External links

US Navy Office of Information Fact File – LSD 

Ship types
Amphibious warfare vessels